Genuine , or  The Genuine Scooter Company is a Chicago-based manufacturer of motorscooters, notably the Stella and Buddy models.  The company markets scooters and accessories through a network of over 240 dealers in the United States. In 2018 it began selling a 400cc air-cooled, single-cylinder motorcycle, under a sister brand 'Genuine Motorcycles'.

History
Founded in 2002, the company was an extension of the vintage scooter business, Scooterworks USA, which sold vintage Vespa and Lambretta scooters via a mail-order catalog, featuring scooter parts and accessories. Scooterworks USA continues to specialize in aftermarket parts and accessories for Genuine, Vespa, Honda, Yamaha, and other scooter brands including Chinese scooters.

Genuine Scooters' first model was a 4-speed manual, two-stroke 150CC "Stella" model, manufactured by LML in India in the year 2002.  The Stella was successful, and in 2006 the company began a relationship with PGO Scooters, a Taiwanese manufacturer. Genuine developed the "Buddy", an automatic scooter with a CVT.  The Buddy features several engine sizes and versions ranging from 49cc, licensed as a moped in many US states, to 170cc with fuel injection. Later introductions were the Rattler 110 (discontinued), the Roughhouse 50, designed more aggressively than the previous classic designs, and the Blur 220i (discontinued), a scooter with a higher-powered fuel-injected engine capable of maintaining expressway speeds.  In 2010, Genuine introduced a version of the Stella with a redesigned 150cc four-stroke engine compliant with California emissions standards, and a 170cc version of the Buddy with fuel injection instead of a carburetor. Following these introductions, and as a result of the economic crash of 2008, it received additional capitalization through investment banker Livingstone Partners.  In 2014, the Stella 125 Automatic was introduced, the first Stella with an automatic (CVT) transmission and a newly redesigned high output 125cc engine.

From time to time, Genuine produces special limited-edition scooters.  These include a "GB150" version of the Stella with British-themed trim, a Black Cat Fireworks scooter similar to the Roughhouse, a high-performance "Psycho" Buddy 125, A high-performance Riot Buddy 50 and Buddy 125, and (in conjunction with neighboring Ferrara Pan Candy Company) the Atomic Fireball Stella and a Lemonhead Buddy 50.  In late 2015 they introduced the special diamond edition 10-Year Anniversary Buddy 50 & 125, celebrating ten years of Buddy.

In 2015, a second sister scooter company was created, 'Chicago Scooter Company to offer a value-based line of scooters to compete with the lower-priced Chinese scooters in the market.  As of 2019, their two models are the "go." and "go. MAX", both 50cc 4 T-based scooters.

Products 

Genuine Scooters features the following scooters in its product line as of January 2019:
 Buddy 50 (50 cc, 2T)
 Buddy 125 (125 cc, 4T)
 Buddy 170i (170 cc, 4T, fuel-injected)
 Buddy KICK (125 cc, 4T, fuel-injected)
 Hooligan 170i (170cc, 4T fuel-injected)
 Roughhouse 50 (50 cc, 2T)
 Roughhouse 50 SPORT (50 cc, 2T)
 Rattler 50 (50 cc, 2T)
 Venture 50 (50cc, 4T)

Genuine Motorcycles as of January 2019:
 G400C (400 cc, single-cylinder, fuel-injected)

References

External links

feature about the Genuine Buddy "Blackjack" model on Jay Leno's Garage

Scooter manufacturers
 Companies based in Chicago
 Vehicle manufacturing companies established in 2002
 American companies established in 2002
2002 establishments in Illinois